Meninggo, or Moskona or Sabena, is a Papuan language spoken in Teluk Bintuni Regency on the north coast of West Papua, Indonesia.

Distribution
In Teluk Bintuni Regency, ethnic Moskona people are located in Moskona Timur District (in Sumuy, Mesna, and Igomu villages), Mardey District, Masyeta District, Jagiro District, Moyeba District, and Mesna District.

References

Further reading 

Languages of western New Guinea

Mantion–Meax languages